|}

The Prix Paul de Moussac is a Group 3 flat horse race in France open to three-year-old thoroughbred colts and geldings. It is run at Chantilly over a distance of 1,600 metres (about 1 mile), and it is scheduled to take place each year in June.

History
The event was established in 1909, and it was originally called the Prix de La Jonchere. It was named after La Jonchere, a successful racehorse in the 1870s. It was initially run at Longchamp over 1,400 metres, and it used to be open to horses aged three or older.

The Prix de La Jonchere was abandoned throughout World War I, with no running from 1915 to 1918. It was held at Le Tremblay for a period during World War II, from 1943 to 1945. Its distance was extended to 1,500 metres in 1966, and it increased to 1,600 metres in 1971. The event was restricted to three-year-olds in 1972.

The race continued to be staged at Longchamp until 1986. For several years thereafter it took place at Chantilly (1987–89, 1991, 1993), Saint-Cloud (1990, 1992) and Maisons-Laffitte (1994). It returned to Longchamp in 1995, and it was transferred to Chantilly in 1997.

In 2006 the event was renamed in memory of Paul de Moussac (1924–1995), a leading racehorse owner and breeder.

Records
Most successful horse (2 wins):
 Rodosto – 1933, 1934
 Menetrier – 1948, 1949
 Luzon – 1952, 1953
 Calife – 1968, 1969

Leading jockey (6 wins):
 Roger Poincelet – Fanatique (1944), Menetrier (1948, 1949), Djebe (1950), Antler (1954), Fiftieth State (1962)
 Freddy Head – Lemmy (1967), Daring Display (1972), Satingo (1973), Avaray (1976), Bellypha (1979), What a Guest (1982)

Leading trainer (8 wins):
 André Fabre – Polish Precedent (1989), Metal Storm (1991), Sharman (1993), Freedom Cry (1994), Android (1996), Grazalema (1999), Art Master (2004), Mutual Trust (2011)

Leading owner (4 wins):
 Daniel Wildenstein – Faraway Son (1971), Boxing Day (1990), Freedom Cry (1994), Android (1996)

Winners since 1978

 Irish Prize finished first in 1999, but he was relegated to fourth place following a stewards' inquiry.

 The 2010 winner Sormiou was later exported to Hong Kong and renamed Mr Bond.

Earlier winners

 1909: Prestissimo
 1910: Oversight
 1911: Le Charmeur
 1912: Calvados III
 1913: Dagor
 1914: Amilcar
 1915–18: no race
 1919: Mihran
 1920: Maskara
 1921: Glorious
 1922:
 1923:
 1924: Perdicas
 1925: Entrechat
 1926: Millet
 1927: Samphire
 1928: King Arthur
 1929:
 1930: Palais Royal
 1931: Dictateur VIII
 1932:
 1933: Rodosto
 1934: Rodosto
 1935: Jus de Raisin
 1936: Ambrose Light
 1937: Flying Thoughts
 1938: Blue Star
 1939: Emir d'Iran
 1940: Corviglia
 1941: Panipat
 1942: Balthazar
 1943: Dogat
 1944: Fanatique
 1945:
 1946: Patchouly
 1947: Dorogoi
 1948: Menetrier
 1949: Menetrier
 1950: Djebe
 1951: Bel Amour
 1952: Luzon
 1953: Luzon
 1954: Antler
 1955: Klairon
 1956: Pas de Quatre
 1957: Verrieres
 1958: Sweet Home
 1959: Radjah
 1960: Trevieres
 1961:
 1962: Fiftieth State
 1963: Catilina
 1964:
 1965: Nemours
 1966: Radames
 1967: Lemmy
 1968: Calife
 1969: Calife
 1970: Bergano
 1971: Faraway Son
 1972: Daring Display
 1973: Satingo
 1974: Contraband
 1975: Dandy Lute
 1976: Avaray
 1977: Lightning

See also
 List of French flat horse races
 Recurring sporting events established in 1909  – this race is included under its original title, Prix de La Jonchere.

References
 France Galop / Racing Post:

 france-galop.com – A Brief History: Prix Paul de Moussac.
 galop.courses-france.com – Prix Paul de Moussac – Palmarès depuis 1980.
 galopp-sieger.de – Prix Paul de Moussac (ex Prix de La Jonchere).
 horseracingintfed.com – International Federation of Horseracing Authorities – Prix Paul de Moussac (2016).
 pedigreequery.com – Prix Paul de Moussac – Chantilly.

Flat horse races for three-year-olds
Chantilly Racecourse
Horse races in France